Murjan may refer to:
 Murjan, Fars (مورجان - Mūrjān)
 Murjan, Kohgiluyeh and Boyer-Ahmad (مورجن - Mūrjan)